Pestovo is a rural locality (a village) in Tregubovskoye Rural Settlement, Velikoustyugsky District, Vologda Oblast, Russia. The population was 37 as of 2002.

Geography 
The distance to Veliky Ustyug is 14.7 km, to Morozovitsa is 8.9 km. Morozovitsa is the nearest rural locality.

References 

Rural localities in Velikoustyugsky District